Goniophora is an extinct genus of clams.  It lived during the Ordovician to Permian periods.

Description
Goniophora has a sharply angular, distinctive shell with a prominent ridge extending the length of the shell.  The shell also has fine growth lines.

References

External links
 
 
 
 

Bivalves described in 1848
Modiomorphida
Prehistoric bivalve genera